Habib Far Abbasi (born 4 September 1997 in Masjed Soleyman) is an Iranian football goalkeeper who currently plays for the Iranian football club Zob Ahan.

References

1997 births
Living people
People from Masjed Soleyman
Iranian footballers
Association football goalkeepers
Naft Masjed Soleyman F.C. players
Sportspeople from Khuzestan province